Lena Valaoritou (1 March 1897 – 1967) was a Greek tennis player. She competed in the women's singles event at the 1924 Summer Olympics.

References

External links
 

1897 births
1967 deaths
Greek female tennis players
Olympic tennis players of Greece
Tennis players at the 1924 Summer Olympics
Sportspeople from Athens